Allegri is an Italian surname. Notable people with the surname include:

Ángel Allegri (1926-1981), Argentine footballer
Antonio da Correggio (1489-1534, full name Antonio Allegri da Correggio), Italian Renaissance painter
Carlo Allegri (1862–1938), Italian engineer
Domenico Allegri (1585-1629), Italian composer (brother of Gregorio)
Gregorio Allegri (1582-1652), Italian composer (the composer of a well-known Miserere)
Lorenzo Allegri (painter) (died 1527), Italian painter and uncle of Correggio
Lorenzo Allegri (1567-1648), Italian composer and lutenist (sometimes known as Lorenzino Tedesco)
Massimiliano Allegri (born 1967), Italian football manager and former player
Natasha Allegri (born 1986), American animation creator, writer and storyboard artist
Pomponio Allegri (1521-1593), Italian painter 

Italian-language surnames